Diaminopropane may refer to either of two isomeric chemical compounds:

 1,2-Diaminopropane
 1,3-Diaminopropane

Diamines